Juan Valle or Juan del Valle (died 1563) was a Roman Catholic prelate who served as the first Bishop of Popayán (1546–1563).

Biography
Juan del Valle was born in Spain. On 27 Aug 1546, Juan Valle was appointed during the papacy of Pope Paul III as Bishop of Popayán.
In 1547, he was consecrated bishop in Spain. 
He served as Bishop of Popayán until his death in 1563 in France.

References

External links and additional sources
 (for Chronology of Bishops) 
 (for Chronology of Bishops) 

16th-century Roman Catholic bishops in New Granada
Bishops appointed by Pope Paul III
1563 deaths
Roman Catholic bishops of Popayán